The Ulla Ulla National Reserve - which today is part of Apolobamba Integrated Management Natural Area - was created in 1972 with an extension of 240,000 ha, a biosphere reserve located in the Franz Tamayo Province, in the Department of La Paz in western Bolivia.

The Reserve is on the high Andean plain northwest of the city of La Paz, with an average elevation of over 4000 meters above sea level.  Its western border is the political border with Peru.  The park is about 2,000 km² in size and is populated by about 12,000 people, most of them of Aymara origin. The park protects part of the Central Andean wet puna ecoregion. It is also the home of the Andean Condor (Vultur gryphus) (reportedly the largest flying bird in the world), as well as significant populations of alpacas, and the largest group of vicuñas (Vicugna vicugna) in Bolivia.

The park was designated a UNESCO biosphere reserve in 1977.

References

Biosphere reserves of Bolivia
Geography of Bolivia
Protected areas of Bolivia
Protected areas established in 1972
Geography of La Paz Department (Bolivia)